Low Ellington is a small village in lower Wensleydale in North Yorkshire, England about  north-west of Masham.

The village was historically also known as Nether Ellington.  Low or Nether Ellington formed, with High or Over Ellington, a township in the ancient parish of Masham in the North Riding of Yorkshire.  At the time of the Domesday Book it was in the possession of Count Alan of Brittany.  In 1566 Christopher Danby acquired the manor of Nether Ellington from Henry Lord Scrope, and the manor remained in the Danby family until 1883.

References

External links

Villages in North Yorkshire